Ulch or ULCH may refer to:
 the Ulch people
 the Ulch language
 Ultra Low Cost Handset, a term used for some very simple mobile phones (see also: Feature phone)